Hangursbanen was a cableway in Voss, Norway, 1,126 metres long with a top altitude of 660m above sea level. It was owned and run by Voss Resort AS, a local ski resort in Voss. 

The cableway starts  about 500 metres from the train station at Voss, up to the Hangursrestaurant, which is in the same building as the cable car top station. The cable car operated during winter, the skiing season and in summer. 

There were two cable cars on the lines, the Dinglo (red) and the Danglo (blue), on opposite sides, but on the same cable. When one was at the top, the other one was at the bottom. The names come from the swaying from side to side which is "dingling" in Norwegian slang.

Hangursbanen had a maximum speed of 8 m/s. The last journey was on 30 August 2015; the cableway was then disassembled. A new one was built in 2019.

History 
Hangursbanen was built in 1963 by Hordaland Mekaniske Verksted and Swiss engineers.

Pictures of the old Hangursbanen and the Hangursrestaurant

External links
Voss Fjellheisar

Cable cars in Norway
Voss
1963 establishments in Norway